Stephanus Franszouis du Toit, known as Fanie du Toit, is a South African politician who has been serving as a permanent delegate to the National Council of Provinces since May 2019. Du Toit is a member of the North West provincial delegation and a party member of the Freedom Front Plus.

Parliamentary career
Du Toit is a member of the Freedom Front Plus. Following the election on 8 May 2019, he was sworn in as an MP on 23 May 2019. He is one of two permanent FF Plus representatives in the National Council of Provinces. Du Toit is a member of the North West delegation.

Committee assignments
He was named to the following committees on 24 June. They are:
Select Committee on Appropriations
Select Committee on Finance
Select Committee on Land Reform, Environment, Mineral Resources and Energy
Select Committee on Public Enterprises and Communication

References

External links

Living people
Year of birth missing (living people)
Afrikaner people
People from North West (South African province)
Members of the National Council of Provinces
Freedom Front Plus politicians
21st-century South African politicians